is a Japanese football player for Vegalta Sendai.

Club statistics
Updated to 8 November 2022.

References

External links
 

Profile at Vissel Kobe
Profile at Vegalta Sendai

1994 births
Living people
Hannan University alumni
Association football people from Ehime Prefecture
Japanese footballers
J1 League players
J2 League players
Vissel Kobe players
Vegalta Sendai players
Association football midfielders
Universiade bronze medalists for Japan
Universiade medalists in football